A farmhouse is a building that serves as the primary quarters in a rural or agricultural setting. Historically, farmhouses were often combined with space for animals called a housebarn. Other farmhouses may be connected to one or more barns, built to form a courtyard, or with each farm building separate from each other.

Europe 
Types of farmhouses in Europe include the following:

France 
A Bresse house is a type of farmhouse found in the Bresse region and characterized by its long length, brick walls and wooden roof.
A Mas is a traditional farmhouse unique to Provence and Southern France.

Germany 

Historically there were three main types of German farmhouses, many of which survive today. The Low German house or Niedersachsenhaus (Lower Saxony house) is found mainly on the North German Plain, but also in large parts of the Netherlands. It is a large structure with a sweeping roof supported by two to four rows of internal posts. The large barn door at the gable end opens into a spacious hall, or Deele, with cattle stalls and barns on either side and living accommodation at the end. The Middle German house may also be a single unit, but access is from the side, and the roof is supported by the outside walls. Later this type of mitteldeutsches Haus was expanded to two or more buildings around a rectangular farmyard, often with a second story. The South German house is found in southern Germany and has two main variants, the Swabian or Black Forest house and the Bavarian farmstead.

Italy 
A Cascina a corte is a courtyard building whose arrangement is based on the Roman villa found in the Po Valley of northern Italy.
A house called  in Italy is a type of farmhouse where the residents work the land but do not own the farm.

Malta 
Ta' Tabibu farmhouse and Ta' Xindi Farmhouse are two typical Maltese farmhouses built with the use of Limestone material. In Maltese a farmhouse is called Razzett. Other examples of Maltese farmhouses are the Ta' Cisju Farmhouse and The Devil's Farmhouse.

North America 
Types of farmhouses in North America include the following:

Canada 

Canadian farmhouses were influenced by European settlers. In Quebec, the style varied from Gothic to Swiss, with the kitchen being the most important room in the house. In Ontario, the farmhouses of the late 19th century were of Victorian influence. Earlier ones used clapboard and later variations had brick. Many had front porches. In the west, dwellings varied from single-story wooden homesteads to straw huts. Wooden houses were built later as railroads brought wood from the Rockies (Alberta, British Columbia). By the early 1900s houses could be purchased as kits from several Canadian and American companies.

United States 

American farmhouses had a straightforward construction designed to function amidst a working farm in a rural setting. They had a simple rectangular floor plan, usually built with local materials, and included a dominant centrally-located fireplace for cooking and heating.

See also 

 List of house types
 Ranch house

References

Further reading

External links 
 

 
Agricultural buildings
House styles
House types
Vernacular architecture